is  a Japanese actress. She is known for roles in TV series such as Iihito and also guest-starring several episodes of  Keitai deka series. Her agency is the Stardust Promotion.

Filmography 
 Kētai Deka the movie (2007)
 Trick 3 (TV)

External links 
Official personal website 

Japanese actresses
1975 births
Living people
Stardust Promotion artists
Actors from Hokkaido